Tigrioides pyralina is a moth in the family Erebidae. It was described by Rothschild in 1912. It is found on Sumbawa.

References

Natural History Museum Lepidoptera generic names catalog

Moths described in 1912
Lithosiina